Melburn Ellis Simons (July 1, 1900 – November 10, 1974), nicknamed "Butch", was a professional baseball player.  He was an outfielder over parts of two seasons (1931–32) with the Chicago White Sox.  For his career, he compiled a .268 batting average in 194 at-bats, with twelve runs batted in.

He was born in Carlyle, Illinois and died in Paducah, Kentucky at the age of 74.

External links

1900 births
1974 deaths
Chicago White Sox players
Major League Baseball outfielders
Minor league baseball managers
Baseball players from Illinois
Montgomery Lions players
Birmingham Barons players
Louisville Colonels (minor league) players
Toledo Mud Hens players
Meridian Scrappers players
Montreal Royals players
Quebec Athletics players
People from Carlyle, Illinois